The petalonamids (Petalonamae) are an extinct group of archaic animals typical of the Ediacaran biota, also called frondomorphs, dating from approximately 635 million years ago to 516 million years ago. They are benthic and motionless animals, that have the shape of leaves, fronds (frondomorphic), feathers or spindles and were initially considered algae, octocorals or sea pens. It is now believed that there are no living descendants of the group, which shares a probable relation to the Ediacaran animals known as Vendozoans.

It is considered that the organisms were fluffy at least in appearance, as if "inflatable." They are particularly difficult to classify phylogenetically. Lacking mouths, intestines, reproductive organs, and with no preserved evidence of internal structures, these organisms' existence is very strange by current standards. The most widely accepted hypothesis is that they could suck nutrients from the water around them by osmosis. The fronds were composed of branched, tubular structures, and the organism was anchored to the ground by a bulbous structure.

The symmetry is generally bilateral, like a feather with one axis and two sides. It can also be trilateral, with one axis and three sides, as seen in the most basal ones, the erniettomorphs.

Distribution
Ediacaran of Canada, Namibia and Russia.

Phylogeny

See also
Vendobionta
Trilobozoa, another group of Edicaran animals who have trilateral symmetry, similar to basal petalonams.
Proarticulata, another group of enigmatic Ediacaran animals
Eumetazoa

References

Notes
Hoyal Cuthill, Jennifer F.; Han, Jian; Álvaro, Javier. Cambrian petalonamid Stromatoveris phylogenetically links Ediacaran biota to later animals. Palaeontology 2018 11.
MARTINSSON, ANDERS. Keys to German palaeontological and stratigraphical terminology. Lethaia October 1978.
BOOK REVIEW. Integrative Zoology 2008 12.
Glaessner, M.F.; Walter, M.R.. New Precambrian fossils from the Arumbera Sandstone, Northern Territory, Australia. Alcheringa: An Australasian Journal of Palaeontology 1975 01.
Grazhdankin, Dmitriy. Patterns of Evolution of the Ediacaran Soft-Bodied Biota. Journal of Paleontology 2014 03.

Animal taxa
Ediacaran life
Petalonamae